Lisandra Tena (born March 29, 1987) is an American actress, best known for her role as Lola Guerrero on the AMC horror drama series Fear the Walking Dead.

Career

In 2017, she joined the cast of Fear the Walking Dead in the series regular role of Lola Guerrero.

Filmography

Film

Television

References

External links 
 

1987 births
Living people
American actresses
Actresses from Albuquerque, New Mexico
21st-century American women